The 1976 Miami Toros indoor season was the second season of the team in the North American Soccer League indoor tournament.  It was part of the club's tenth season in professional soccer.  This year, the team finished in third place in the Eastern Regional.  They did not make the playoffs as only the top team in each of the four regions were selected.  This was the last season of the indoor team and the tournament, as the NASL organized a new indoor league three years later in 1979.

Background

Review

Competitions

NASL indoor regular season

Eastern Regional
played at the Bayfront Center in St. Petersburg, Florida
 

  

*Tampa Bay wins region, advances to semifinals

Results summaries

Results by round

Match reports

Statistics

Transfers

References 

1976
Fort Lauderdale Strikers
Miami Toros indoor
Miami Toros